Alberto Berasategui was the defending champion, but lost in the quarterfinals to Carlos Costa.

Thomas Muster won the title by defeating Costa 3–6, 7–6(7–5), 6–4 in the final.

Seeds

Draw

Finals

Top half

Bottom half

References

External links
 Official results archive (ATP)
 Official results archive (ITF)

Croatia Open
1995 ATP Tour